E. J. Nauzad Khan is a cinematographer working in Indian films and has worked in Tamil and Telugu language films.

Nauzad handled the camera for Agadam directed by Isaq, that has been certified by the Guinness World Records as the longest uncut film that had a running time for 2 hours, 3 minutes and 30 seconds. and was shot on 7 December 2012.

Nauzad was the cinematographer for the Telugu remake of Agadam titled as Seesa as well, directed by Isaq.

Nauzad Khan worked as assistant cameraman with U. K. Senthil Kumar and R. Madhi in most of their films.

Filmography

References

External links
 

Tamil film cinematographers
Telugu film cinematographers
Cinematographers from Tamil Nadu
People from Coimbatore district
1970 births
Living people